The Space Vehicle Mockup Facility (SVMF) is a large open space area located inside Building 9 of Johnson Space Center in Houston. It consists of a 200 meter long room that houses several Space Shuttle mockups, as well as mockups of every major pressurized module on the International Space Station. It is primarily used for astronaut training and systems familiarization.

The International Space Station modules are 1:1 scale and are maintained as accurate as possible to the real spacecraft in orbit. The facility also has a 1/6th gravity simulator and Mars Rover test vehicles. An industrial door at the North End, and overhead cranes allows the installation of new mockup spacecraft to be loaded into the facility. Space Center Houston allows a level 9 VIP tourist access to the entire training facility. The tour is given over two days and is $179 a ticket..

Previous trainers

Space Shuttle Orbiter Trainers
Full Fuselage Trainer (FFT)
Crew Compartment Trainer (CCT)
Crew Compartment Trainer II (CCT II)

Current trainers

International Space Station Trainer
Space Station Mockup and Training Facility (SSMTF)

Other facilities
Precision Air Bearing Facility (PABF)
Partial Gravity Simulator (POGO)

External links
 https://web.archive.org/web/20110720095029/http://dx14.jsc.nasa.gov/svmf.htm

References

Human spaceflight
Johnson Space Center